

Friedrich-Wilhelm Otte (22 September 1898 – 8 May 1944) was a German general in the Wehrmacht during World War II. He was a recipient of the Knight's Cross of the Iron Cross. Otte was killed on 8 May 1944 at Sevastopol during the Soviet Crimean Offensive.

Awards and decorations

 Knight's Cross of the Iron Cross on 13 November 1942 as Oberst and commander of Jäger-Regiment 207

References

Citations

Bibliography

 

1898 births
1944 deaths
People from Nowa Ruda
People from the Province of Silesia
Major generals of the German Army (Wehrmacht)
German Army personnel of World War I
German police officers
Recipients of the clasp to the Iron Cross, 1st class
Recipients of the Gold German Cross
Recipients of the Knight's Cross of the Iron Cross
German Army personnel killed in World War II
German Army generals of World War II